Indiana is a state located in the Midwestern United States. As of the 2021 census estimate, the state had 6,805,985 residents. There are 569 municipalities.

Under Indiana law, a municipality must have a minimum of 2,000 people to incorporate as a city. Except as noted, all cities are "third-class" cities with a seven-member city council and an elected clerk-treasurer. "Second-class" cities had a population of at least 35,000 and up to 600,000 at time of designation, and have a nine-member city council and an elected clerk. Indianapolis is the only "first-class" city in Indiana under state law, making it subject to a consolidated city-county government known as Unigov. A town is differentiated from a city in that a town can not become a city until it has a population of at least 2,000.  The form of government is also different from that of a city in that the council is both the legislative and executive branches of government.  The mayor is selected by the council from within its ranks and operates as a first among equals.

Largest cities

Municipalities

Towns

See also

 List of metropolitan areas in Indiana
 List of Micropolitan Statistical Areas of Indiana
 List of census-designated places in Indiana

References

External links
Indiana Association of Cities & Towns

 
Indiana
Cities